Stade Pierre-Aliker (until 2007 Stade d'Honneur de Dillon), is a multi-purpose stadium in Fort-de-France, Martinique. It is currently used mostly for football matches, as the home of the Club Colonial and the Martinique national football team. The stadium can hold 18,000 people.

References

Football venues in Martinique
Fort-de-France
Athletics (track and field) venues in Martinique
Martinique
Multi-purpose stadiums in France